Cheal, Cheale or Cheel may refer to:

People
 Anne Cheale (fl. 2000–2011), British councillor
 Edwin Cheel (1872–1951), Australian botanist
 Jay Cheel (born 1979), Canadian filmmaker
 John Cheale (fl. 1650–1685), English politician
 Peter Cheal (1846–1931), New Zealand surveyor

Other uses
 Cheal Point, South Orkney Islands, Antarctica
 Cheel Arena, multi-purpose arena in Potsdam, New York, USA

See also
 Chell (disambiguation)
 Chiel (disambiguation)